Zacatula is a monotypic genus of bush crickets in the subfamily Mecopodinae, containing the species Z. scabra, erected by Francis Walker in 1870 and found in eastern Indonesia.

References

External links

Tettigoniidae